Betancor is a surname. Notable people with the surname include:

Jefté Betancor (born 1993), Spanish footballer
Jeremy Betancor (born 1998), Spanish footballer

Spanish-language surnames